The Third Rail is an independent supporters group for New York City FC of Major League Soccer. It was founded on May 21, 2013, the same day as the expansion club was announced. The name of the club references the third rail, which provides power to the New York City Subway.

History 
The group began as a loose online association of supporters before organizing its first public meeting in February 2014. Since then it has organized regular meetings, pub crawls and other events including viewing parties for the 2014 FIFA World Cup.

Name and logo 
The group's name was chosen by a public vote of supporters on May 21, 2014. It refers to the third rail, which powers New York City's subway system.

The Third Rail logo was designed by graphic artist Matthew Wolff. It features a raised Art Deco fist holding three lightning bolts, and uses the same typeface and color scheme as New York City FC's logo. When the logo was introduced, New York City FC announced that the MLS club was "powered by the Third Rail".

Supporters section 
Members of the Third Rail are eligible to purchase New York City FC season tickets in the group's exclusive area, Sections 236 and 237 of Yankee Stadium.

References

External links 

 
 Supporters page on NYCFC.com

Major League Soccer fan clubs
New York City FC
2013 establishments in New York City